Badass: A Relentless Onslaught of the Toughest Warlords, Vikings, Samurai, Pirates, Gunfighters, and Military Commanders to Ever Live, also known as Badass: The Book, is a history and biography book. It is the debut book of Ben Thompson, owner of the website Badass of The Week.

The book focuses on historical figures considered to be badass: having exceptional toughness, aggressiveness, battle skills and/or resilience, and have a significant achievement or impact on history. Thompson has stated in an interview that he intended to convey history in the language of youth, so that they feel like "reading something [they're] not supposed to, but ... actually learning something."

Content 
The book has 40 historical figures organized in chronological order through four major time periods:   Antiquity, the Middle Ages, the Age of Gunpowder, and the Modern Era. Some of the figures are:

 Ramesses II
 Leonidas
 Xenophon
 Alexander the Great
 Chandragupta Maurya
 Emperor Gaozu
 Julius Caesar
 Surena
 Julia Agrippina
 Alaric I
 Khalid bin Walid
 Charles Martel
 Ulf the Quarrelsome
 William the Conqueror
 Harald Hardrada
 Tomoe Gozen
 Genghis Khan
 Vlad the Impaler
 Miyamoto Musashi
 Blackbeard
 Anne Bonny
 Peter Francisco
 Horatio Nelson
 Napoleon Bonaparte
 Agustina of Aragon
 Bass Reeves
 Nikola Tesla
 Manfred Von Richthofen
 Henry Johnson (World War I soldier)
 Eliot Ness
 Irina Sebrova
 Jack Churchill
 General George S. Patton
 Carlos Hathcock
 Bruce Lee
 Yonatan Netanyahu

There are also additional features such as a list of "Badass Marines" and a feature on "Awesome Things You Can Shoot Out of a Catapult." The illustrations are done by several artists that have done work for Wizards of the Coast, White Wolf, and DC Comics.

References

External links 
 Badass: The Book FAQ
 Badass of The Week
 Amazon.com listing

2009 non-fiction books
Biographies (books)
Works about Julius Caesar